National Route 136 is a national highway of Japan connecting Shimoda, Shizuoka and Mishima, Shizuoka in Japan, with a total length of 111.3 km (69.16 mi).

References

136
Roads in Shizuoka Prefecture